The Apprentice Diplomat is a 1919 German silent film directed by Erich Schönfelder and starring Paul Heidemann, Max Zilzer and Mabel May-Yong.

References

External links

Films of the Weimar Republic
Films directed by Erich Schönfelder
German silent feature films
German black-and-white films
1910s German films